The Sikorsky S-60 helicopter, a prototype "flying crane", was derived from the S-56 in 1958. Proving to be underpowered, the development of the S-60 led to the larger, turbine-engined Sikorsky CH-54 Tarhe military transport helicopter, and its civil S-64 Skycrane variant, which were already on the drawing board by the time the sole example of the S-60 crashed on 3 April 1961.

Design and development

In 1958, Sikorsky began designing the S-60 as a prototype "flying crane" helicopter. The S-60 utilized the transmission, rotor system and piston engines from the CH-37/S-56.

The fuselage of the S-60 was a simple "pod-and-boom" design with the engines mounted in side pods and long tailwheel-style landing gear that allowed it to straddle cargoes. The crew cabin was mounted in the nose, with aft-mounted controls for the co-pilot to use during loading and unloading operations. The S-60 had an automatic stabilization system to allow it to hover precisely, using inputs from a sidestick controller.

Operational history

The S-60  (registered N807) first flew on March 25, 1959. The helicopter accumulated 333 hours of flight in its two-year flight career, and was evaluated by the US Navy, with demonstrations also flown for the US Army. While effective in its designed role, the helicopter proved to be underpowered. Sikorsky was already working on an enlarged, turboshaft-powered successor, the Model S-64, which was ordered into production for the US Army as the Sikorsky CH-54 Tarhe.

Igor Sikorsky was fully involved in the development of the prototype S-60, from the initial design through flight testing. It was one of the last aircraft to have this distinction. The prototype crashed in April 1961.

Survivor
The wreckage of the S-60 was transferred to the New England Air Museum in the 1970s, and is currently being restored by its new owners, the Connecticut Air and Space Center, in Stratford, Connecticut.

Specifications (S-60)

See also

References
Notes

Bibliography

 Donald, David, ed. The Complete Encyclopedia of World Aircraft. New York: Barnes & Noble, 1997. .
 Harding, Stephen. U.S. Army Aircraft Since 1947: An Illustrated History. Atglen, Pennsylvania: Schiffer Publishing Ltd., 1997, First edition 1990. .

External links

 Greg Goebel's Vectorsite: Sikorsky Giant Helicopters: S-64, S-65 and S-80
 CH-54 Skycrane/Tarhe on Global Security.org
 HELIS.com Sikorsky S-60 Database

United States military helicopters
1950s United States military transport aircraft
S-060
1950s United States helicopters
Twin-engined piston helicopters
Aircraft first flown in 1959